Silin may also refer to:
 Silin, Poland, a village in Poland.
 Silin (surname), a Russian surname
 Saint Silin or Sulien, Welsh saint
 Silin Dam, a dam in Guizhou Province, China
 Silin gun, a Russian machine gun